Picton is a hamlet and former civil parish, now in the parish of Mickle Trafford and District, situated near to Chester, in the Borough of Cheshire West and Chester and the ceremonial county of Cheshire, England. 
The civil parish was abolished in 2015 to form Mickle Trafford and District.

The name derives partly from a personal noun, with Pica's-tūn, meaning Pica's settlement or farmstead. 
Formerly a township in the Broxton Hundred, its population was 138 in 1801, 155 in 1851, 141 in 1901, 119 in 1951 and 58 in the 2001 census.
 
In 1995 aerial photography showed evidence of a Roman practice fort in the parish.

Picton Hall and Picton Hall Farmhouse are designated by English Heritage as a Grade II listed building.  It is the only listed building in the parish.

References
Citations

Sources

External links

Villages in Cheshire
Former civil parishes in Cheshire
Cheshire West and Chester